The Taieri Gorge is located on the Taieri River, in the South Island of New Zealand.
It is a deep canyon carved by the Taieri River on the middle stage of its journey from Central Otago to the Pacific Ocean, between the high plateau of the Maniototo and the coastal Taieri Plains. A walking track leads from Outram into the southern end of the gorge.

For the upper  of the gorge, upstream from the Wingatui Viaduct, the Taieri Gorge Railway runs alongside (and considerably above) the river.

References

External links 

Canyons and gorges of Otago
Taieri River